Fauji Foundation Hospitals, are a group of hospitals started by Fauji Foundation in multiple cities, including Lahore and Rawalpindi.

History
The first hospital called TB hospital as part of Fauji Foundation Healthcare System was established in 1954.

Hospitals
 Fauji Foundation Hospital Rawalpindi
 Fauji Foundation Hospital Lahore
 Shaukat Omar Memorial Hospital, Karachi
 Fauji Foundation Hospital Peshawar
 Fauji Foundation Hospital Kallar Kahar
 Fauji Foundation Hospital Jehlum
 Fauji Foundation Mansehra
 Al Hilal Fauji Foundation Hospital Faisalabad
 Fauji Foundation Hospital Sargodha
 Fauji Foundation Multan

Departments
They provides facilities of: 
 Emergency and Trauma centre
 Outpatient Department  
Internal Medicine
 Surgery
 Paediatrics
 Orthopaedics
 Gynaecology and Obstetrics 
 ENT & Eye
 Paeds ICU 
 Neonatal ICU 
 Medical ICU 
 Urology
 Post Operative Care Unit 
 Operation Theatres, Laboratory, Radiology (Digital x-ray, Ultrasound and CT scan) are well established. Visiting consultants of all specialties and subspecialties are available. This hospital is providing services free of cost to families of ex-army persons and at very affordable rates to patients from the common public.

References

External links
Location on Google Maps

Hospital buildings completed in 2001
Hospitals established in 2001
Hospital networks in Pakistan
Fauji Foundation